Phasmahyla spectabilis is a species of frog in the subfamily Phyllomedusinae. It is endemic to Brazil and known from the north-eastern Minas Gerais and adjacent southern Bahia.

Phasmahyla spectabilis has a typical call dominant frequency of  1849±79 Hz.

References

spectabilis
Frogs of South America
Amphibians of Brazil
Endemic fauna of Brazil
Amphibians described in 2008